The FIL World Luge Natural Track Championships 2003 took place in Železniki, Slovenia.

Men's singles

Women's singles

Men's doubles

Medal table

References
Men's doubles natural track World Champions
Men's singles natural track World Champions
Women's singles natural track World Champions

FIL World Luge Natural Track Championships
2003 in luge
2002 in Slovenian sport
Luge in Slovenia